Kim Jin-seo (Hangul:김진서) (born November 29, 1996) is a South Korean figure skater. He is the 2012 and 2014 South Korean national senior champion, the 2012 ISU JGP Austria bronze medalist and the 2014 Ondrej Nepela Trophy silver medalist.

Career

Early career
Kim started skating at the age of 11 as a means of physical therapy for his health. Within a few months, his then-teacher recognized Kim's potential and suggested skating seriously to try to make the Korean national team. He began competing in 2009. In the 2010–11 season, he won the junior men's title at the 2011 South Korean Championships.

2011–12 season: First senior national title
In June 2011, Kim sustained an injury to his left eardrum after falling on a rainy day during an outdoor practice session. The fall resulted in 80% of his left eardrum being torn and the need for surgery to replace the lost tissues. Despite being only partially recovered from the injury, Kim participated in the qualifying event for the ISU Junior Grand Prix (JGP) series but was unsuccessful. A few months later, in January 2012, he competed in the senior men's event at the 2012 South Korean Championships. He delivered two nearly-clean programs which brought him a national title for the first time in his career with a total of 186.44.

Kim joined 2010 Olympic ladies champion Yuna Kim in an ice show, the All That Skate Spring 2012, held in Seoul, South Korea on 4–6 May 2012, along with other skaters such as Shen Xue / Zhao Hongbo, Patrick Chan, and Stéphane Lambiel.

2012–13 season: Junior Grand Prix debut
Kim won his country's JGP selection event, held in August, earning two spots for the Junior Grand Prix. He made his junior international debut at the JGP Austria, where he won the bronze medal after being placed tenth in the short and second in the free skate with a total of 175.87. At this event, he surpassed the minimum TES for the Worlds in his nearly-clean free-skate. At the JGP Croatia, Kim had a few mistakes in the short placing in eighth, but again rebounded in the free skate to place second in the free skate. With a total of 176.43, he placed in the fourth position. After two JGP events, he competed at the NRW Trophy to get the minimum TES for the short program. He skated a clean short program and qualified for the 2013 World Championships in London, Ontario, Canada. In the short program, he landed a clean triple axel and triple lutz with connecting steps and stepped out of his triple toe-loop triple toe-loop combination. He placed 26th in the short and just missed qualifying for the free skate by a point and a half.

2013–14 season
Kim started the season at a JGP event in Riga, Latvia, where he placed 6th. After the event, at the 2013 Nebelhorn Trophy which was the qualifying event for the 2014 Winter Olympics, Kim placed 20th in the men's event. A few weeks later, Kim placed 6th in the JGP in Tallinn, Estonia, with total of 184.53. At the Korean Nationals, Kim had a clean short program and headed into the free skate as the leader. In the free skate, he also had an almost-clean programme. With the total of 209.35, he became a two-time Korean national champion, which meant he also qualified for the 2014 World Championships. At the World Championships, he had his new personal best in short, free skate and total and placed in 16th place. Earning a total of 202.80 points, he became the first Korean male skater to cross the 200-point mark.

2014–15 season: Grand Prix debut 
Kim was assigned to the 2014 NHK Trophy. 
At the 2014 Ondrej Nepela Trophy, Kim became the first Korean male skater to break the 70-point mark in the short program with the score of 71.44. He placed in 9th place at both his Grand Prix assignments. At the 2015 World Junior Championships, he placed fourth in the short programs, 11th in the free skate, and ninth overall, thus securing two spots at the 2016 Junior Worlds.

2015–16 season
Kim began his season at the Ice Star, where he won the gold medal. He was assigned to the 2015 Skate Canada and the 2015 Trophée Éric Bompard in the 2015–16 ISU Grand Prix season.

At the Skate Canada in Lethbridge, Alberta, he placed 9th overall. At the Trophée Éric Bompard in Bordeaux, France, he placed 9th in the short program before the free skate was cancelled due to the November 2015 Paris attacks.

Personal life 
On August 4, 2022, Kim announced that he would marry his non-celebrity girlfriend and announced that his girlfriend was pregnant with their first child.

Programs

Competitive highlights
GP: Grand Prix; CS: Challenger Series; JGP: Junior Grand Prix

Detailed results

Senior 

Personal bests are highlighted in bold.

Junior level

References

External links

 

South Korean male single skaters
1996 births
Living people
Figure skaters from Seoul
Figure skaters at the 2017 Asian Winter Games
Competitors at the 2017 Winter Universiade